Jack McLaughlin (born 29 January 1959) is a Northern Irish former professional snooker and billiards player from Lurgan. McLaughlin is most notable for winning the 1988 Irish Professional Championship.

Career
McLaughlin turned professional in 1985 at the age of 26 after being Northern Ireland Amateur Champion in 1983 and 1984. McLaughlin's most notable moment came in the 1988 Irish Professional Championship in Antrim when he was the surprise winner of the tournament. After defeating Pascal Burke, Paul Watchorn and Joe O'Boye, he faced 1985 World Snooker Champion Dennis Taylor in the final. Despite being a huge underdog, McLaughlin won the match 9–4 to become the first winner other than Taylor or Alex Higgins in sixteen years. The following season he came close to defending his title, but lost 7–9 to Higgins.

Outside of this win, McLaughlin's best ranking finish as a professional was reaching the quarter-final of the 1989 Dubai Classic where he was defeated 5-1 by Danny Fowler.

McLaughlin left the professional game in 1995. After continuing to play amateur snooker he took up billiards in 2011, most notably reaching the final of the UK Seniors event in 2014.

Now working as a prison governor, he plays golf in his spare time as a leisure pursuit with his wife Lynne.

Performance and rankings timeline

Career finals

Non-ranking finals: 2 (1 title)

Amateur finals: 2 (2 titles)

References

Snooker players from Northern Ireland
Players of English billiards from Northern Ireland
1959 births
Living people